Joo Hyun-hee (born 3 January 1982) is a South Korean badminton player. Joo has joined the Daekyo team when she was in the junior group age. She was part of the Korean girls' team that competed at the 1999 and 2000 Asian Junior Championships, winning the bronze and silver medal respectively. She also won the bronze medal in the girls' doubles event in both competitions. Joo later helped the national junior mixed team won the silver medal at the 2000 World Junior Championships in Guangzhou, China. In the senior international level, she was the runner-up at the 2005 and 2007 Canada International.

Achievements

Asian Junior Championships
Girls' doubles

BWF International Challenge/Series
Women's doubles

Mixed doubles

 BWF International Challenge tournament
 BWF International Series tournament

References

External links
 

1982 births
Living people
South Korean female badminton players
21st-century South Korean women